Wescosville is a census-designated place located in Lehigh County, Pennsylvania. It is located between Allentown and Trexlertown in Lower Macungie Township. It is part of the Lehigh Valley, which had a population of 861,899 and was the 68th most populous metropolitan area in the U.S. as of the 2020 census.

Its ZIP Codes are split between the Allentown codes of 18103, 18104, and 18106. As of the 2010 census the population was 5,872.

History
Wescosville was named after Philip Wesco, who operated a local inn in the 1820s.

Geography
Wescosville is located in south-central Lehigh County in the northern corner of Lower Macungie Township. The community drains south toward Little Lehigh Creek and north toward Cedar Creek, a tributary of the Little Lehigh. Wescosville is part of the Lehigh River watershed.

Transportation

The primary business district of Wescosville runs along Hamilton Boulevard and is bisected by the Pennsylvania Turnpike Northeast Extension (I-476), also known as the Northeast Extension of the Pennsylvania Turnpike. Interstate 78 runs along the northeastern edge of Wescosville, interchanging with U.S. 222. I-78 East proceeds  to the Holland Tunnel's entrance to Lower Manhattan. I-78 West via Interstate 81 proceeds  to Harrisburg. Hamilton Boulevard continues northeast  to Allentown.

Wescosville is home to a park and ride lot at the site of the former Charcoal Drive-In restaurant on Hamilton Boulevard that serves Trans-Bridge Lines and Klein Transportation buses to Midtown Manhattan in New York City.

Public education
Wescosville is part of the East Penn School District. Students in grades nine through 12 attend Emmaus High School in Emmaus. Students in grades six through eight attend either Eyer Middle School or Lower Macungie Middle School, both located in Macungie. Students in kindergarten to fifth grade attend either Wescosville Elementary School in Wescosville or Willow Lane Elementary School in Macungie.

Notable people
Anna Kunkel, former All-American Girls Professional Baseball League outfielder
Christine Taylor, actress and wife of Ben Stiller

References

Census-designated places in Lehigh County, Pennsylvania
Census-designated places in Pennsylvania